Extraña ternura is a 1964 Argentine film directed by Daniel Tinayre based on a novel by Guy des Cars.

Cast

Music
Music for the film was written by Astor Piazzolla and Lucio Milena. At the persuasion of Egle Martin, Piazzolla set the poem "Graciela Oscura" by Ulyses Petit de Murat to music for the film; this song was repeated several times in the movie, and was reported to be the main attraction of the film when it opened at the Cine Monumental in the spring of 1964.

References

External links
 

1964 films
1960s Spanish-language films
Argentine black-and-white films
Films directed by Daniel Tinayre
1960s Argentine films